Ivan Ponomarenko (born 10 May 1998) is a Ukrainian professional footballer who plays as goalkeeper for Lviv.

Career
Born in Saky Raion, Ponomarenko is a product of the DVUFK and FC Dnipro youth academy systems from Dnipro.

In December 2021 he signed with FC Lviv in the Ukrainian Premier League.

References

External links

1998 births
Living people
People from Saky Raion
Ukrainian footballers
Association football goalkeepers
FC Dnipro players
FC Krymteplytsia Molodizhne players
CSKA Pamir Dushanbe players
FC Bukovyna Chernivtsi players
FC Lviv players
Ukrainian Premier League players
Tajikistan Higher League players
Ukrainian Second League players
Ukrainian expatriate footballers
Expatriate footballers in Tajikistan
Ukrainian expatriate sportspeople in Tajikistan